Stuart Lubbock (1 October 196931 March 2001) was a meat-factory worker from Essex, England, who died under suspicious circumstances at the home of the television personality Michael Barrymore.

Lubbock was pronounced dead at the Princess Alexandra Hospital, Harlow, at 08:23 on 31 March 2001. Michael Barrymore and two others presentJames Futers and Simon Shawreported finding Lubbock unconscious in the swimming pool of Barrymore's home in Roydon, Essex, earlier that morning. He was wearing only boxer shorts. He was discovered by the pathologist at the hospital to have "serious" anal injuries, with traces of ecstasy, cocaine and alcohol in his blood.

Background
Lubbock, a wholesale butcher's supervisor from Harlow, Essex, had visited the home of Barrymore after meeting him in The Millennium nightclub. A party followed.

According to BBC News, neighbours described the deceased as a "pleasant, sociable" man who lived with his father Terry and brother Kevin in a terraced house in Harlow. At the time of Lubbock's death, he had two daughters, aged four and one, who were being brought up by his former partner, Claire Wicks, whom he had left months earlier.

Inquest

A September 2002 inquest reached an open verdict: Coroner Caroline Beasley-Murray said, "None of these witnesses who were party guests for three hours have given to this court an explanation about how Stuart Lubbock, a previously fit 31-year old, should be found floating in a swimming pool at the premises with a significant level of alcohol and drugs in his system and have serious anal injuries."

Initial investigation dropped
Dr. Heath concluded that he had drowned accidentally. Three other pathologists who examined the body said that the marks on Lubbock's forehead suggested that he might have been asphyxiated. However, none claimed that this was the cause of death. It was admitted that these marks could have been caused by the extensive attempts to resuscitate Lubbock. It had been confirmed that Dr. Heath has volunteered to stop working for the police, having found faulty evidence of foul play in previous deaths where there was none.

2006 developments

Private prosecution launched, later dismissed by judge
On 11 January 2006, Tony Bennett, the Lubbock family's solicitor, issued an application in the Harlow Magistrates Court for Michael Barrymore to be charged with six offences, relating to his actions on the morning Lubbock's death. Bennett & Co. attempted to serve the papers on Barrymore whilst he was appearing on Channel 4's Celebrity Big Brother UK, generating more headlines. This was later thrown out of court by a district judge who ruled that Barrymore had no case to answer.

Police review case
On 1 February 2006, Essex Police reviewed the death of Stuart Lubbock.

Inquest witness arrested, charges later dropped
On 10 May 2006, Kylie Merritt, a witness at the coroner's inquest, was arrested on suspicion of perjury. On 14 June 2006, the charges against Merritt were dropped. Merritt was a witness on the night of Lubbock's death. Merritt told the inquest, "I saw Mr. Parker (Barrymore's real name) put some cocaine on his finger and rub it on Mr. Lubbock's gums." She later admitted that she could not be certain that her allegation was true during a lie detector test conducted by tabloid newspaper the News of the World.

Pathologist discredited
On 19 June 2006, Michael Heath, the pathologist at the autopsy of Lubbock, was called before a disciplinary tribunal at the Old Bailey. The following day, Dr. Heath's testimony was discredited. At the hearing, Charles Miskin QC for the Home Office said: "It is the belief of The Home Office that Dr. Heath has fallen short of the high standards required by the Secretary of State of forensic pathologists."

Case re-opened
Lubbock's father Terry set up the Lubbock Trust to campaign for further investigation into the case and to generate as much publicity as possible. On 2 December 2006, police announced they were reopening the investigation into Lubbock's death.

Investigation by Independent Police Complaints Commission
Following a dossier on the case presented to the Independent Police Complaints Commission (I.P.C.C.) by Terry Lubbock's lawyer Tony Bennett on 1 December 2006, the IPCC approved an investigation by an outside police force into over 30 separate allegations of incompetence and possible corruption by Essex Police. The allegations pertain to their initial £8million investigation into Stuart Lubbock's death. In April 2007, the IPCC elevated this investigation, internally managed and run, and appointed former Hertfordshire Police Officer Adrian Tapp to head the investigation. In May 2007, the IPCC agreed with Bennett that a total of 38 separate complaints about Essex Police would be investigated.

Terry Lubbock died in 2021. His friend Harry Cichy said, “He’s died sad, because he’s died knowing people never knew the truth about what happened. But no one could have fought harder for their son. A new inquest was what really mattered to him. He had lost faith in the police. Sadly, he’s died not knowing whether there will be another inquest.”

2007 arrests
On 14 June 2007, three men were arrested in connection with Lubbock's death. Michael Barrymore was one arrested on a charge of murder. On 15 June, Barrymore was released without charge after being questioned.

Civil action by Barrymore against Essex Police (2015–17)
In July 2015, Barrymore began the process of suing Essex Police over his arrest. In October 2016, it was reported that High Court papers showed police had admitted that Barrymore was wrongfully arrested and detained. This was because "the arresting officer, PC Cootes, was not fully aware of the grounds for arrest ... and not by reason of a lack of reasonable grounds to suspect the claimant."

On 18 August 2017, the High Court in London ruled that Barrymore would be entitled to "more than nominal" damages against Essex Police after being wrongly arrested 10 years previously. The judge did not decide on the sum to be awarded, as his ruling dealt only with the preliminary issue of the level of damages to be awarded. Barrymore was not present for the decision but valued his claim at more than £2.4million. Essex Police released a statement on 1 July 2019 to announce that the claim for damages had been dropped, and that no payment had been made to Barrymore, following an appeal; the Court of Appeals judges determined instead that Barrymore was entitled only to “nominal” damages.

Channel 4 documentary, renewed appeal, and arrest (2020–21)
On 4 February 2020, Essex Police offered a £20,000 reward for information leading to a conviction. The cash reward, funded by Essex Police and the charity Crimestoppers, was in response to a new Channel 4 documentary on the incident, Barrymore: The Body in the Pool, that aired on 6 February 2020.

On 17 March 2021, Essex Police confirmed that they had arrested a 50-year-old man from Cheshire in connection with the indecent assault and murder of Stuart Lubbock, as a result of the appeal, and were preparing to submit a file to the Crown Prosecution Service.

Lucy Morris of Essex Police stated, "Nine people were at that party. We know that not everyone was responsible for what happened but someone was. Now is the time to come forward, if you haven’t done so already, to set this matter to rest by providing us with any information you have." She emphasised Essex police had, "never given up on this case" and investigations were complex.

Following Terry Lubbock's death Det Ch Insp Jennings said, "Terry's devotion to his son and to his pursuit of justice knew no bounds. He was an example to many of us in his relentless quest for truth and justice. Our investigation into Stuart's death will not end with Terry's - as long as the case remains open, we will do all we can to deliver justice for him and his family. To this end we urge anyone who has information about Stuart's death to please now, more than ever, do the right thing and come forward."

References

External links
The Lubbock Trust website

1969 births
2001 deaths
Deaths by person in England
People from Harlow